The Feminine Touch is a 1941 American comedy film directed by W.S. Van Dyke, and starring Rosalind Russell and Don Ameche.

Plot
College professor John Hathaway (Don Ameche) is writing a book about jealousy, and how he doesn't believe in it. He isn't the least bit perturbed, for example, when his lovely wife Julie (Rosalind Russell) is the object of desire in the eyes of the school's football star, Rubber Legs Ryan (Gordon Jones).

John goes to New York to meet with publisher Elliott Morgan (Van Heflin), and meets associate Nellie Woods (Kay Francis), who loves Elliott, but can't get him to commit. Elliott is infatuated with John's wife Julie, but after a while, he realizes that she is faithful to her husband. Julie, though, continues to be irked at John's complete lack of jealousy.

A misunderstanding leads to John being placed under arrest. Elliott's failure to help him or to contact lawyer Freddie Bond, as promised, is maddening to Julie, who wants John to knock his block off. She also catches John and Nellie in an embrace, and turns red with jealous rage, which puzzles John because they were merely celebrating his book sale.

Nellie's threat to quit finally gets Elliott to propose, but one day, John finally explodes and strikes him, which leads to a fight between the two women, too. By the time a total stranger calls his wife "sugar" on the street, John is ready to come up swinging.

Cast
 Rosalind Russell as Julie Hathaway
 Don Ameche as Prof. John Hathaway
 Kay Francis as Nellie Woods
 Van Heflin as Elliott Morgan
 Donald Meek as Capt. Makepeace Liveright
 Gordon Jones as Rubber-Legs Ryan
 Henry Daniell as Shelley Mason
 Sidney Blackmer as Freddie Bond
 Grant Mitchell as Dean Hutchinson
 David Clyde as Brighton
 Julie Gibson sings "I'm Jealous"

References

External links

 
 
 
 
 The Feminine Touch at Kay Francis Films

1941 films
1940s screwball comedy films
American screwball comedy films
American black-and-white films
Films scored by Franz Waxman
Films directed by W. S. Van Dyke
Films set in New York (state)
Metro-Goldwyn-Mayer films
Films produced by Joseph L. Mankiewicz
1941 comedy films
1940s English-language films
1940s American films